Iva Budařová and Regina Rajchrtová were the defending champions, but Rajchrtová opted to rest in order to compete at the Fed Cup the next week. Budařová teamed up with Catherine Tanvier and lost in the semifinals to Carin Bakkum and Nicole Jagerman.

Sandra Cecchini and Patricia Tarabini won the title by defeating Bakkum and Jagerman 1–6, 6–2, 6–3 in the final.

Seeds

Draw

Draw

References

External links
 Official results archive (ITF)
 Official results archive (WTA)

Women's Doubles